Acnodon oligacanthus is a species of serrasalmids found in South America. 
It is found in the North Guiana Shield rivers.

References

Planquette, P., P. Keith and P.-Y. Le Bail, 1996. Atlas des poissons d'eau douce de Guyane. Tome 1. Collection du Patrimoine Naturel Volume 22, MNHN, Paris & INRA, Paris. 429 p. 

Serrasalmidae
Taxa named by Johannes Peter Müller
Taxa named by Franz Hermann Troschel
Fish described in 1844
Freshwater fish of South America